Tallinn Music Week (TMW) is an international new music showcase, city culture festival and networking event for music and creative industry professionals, held every spring in Tallinn, Estonia since 2009. Operated by Tallinn-based company Shiftworks OÜ, it showcases emerging artists from all over Europe and beyond, provides a networking platform for music and creative industry professionals, and introduces the city of Tallinn. The festival is attended by around 20,000 people and 1,000 music industry executives yearly. TMW has been acknowledged as an important industry event and attractive tourism destination by The Guardian, New York Times, Forbes, and Experty.by.

Festival programme

Music festival 

TMW's music programme presents multi-genre line-up from 100 – 250 artists. The festival has been acknowledged for embracing and introducing new emerging talent from Estonia, Nordics, Russia and beyond with various genres from experimental electronica to neo-classical represented. TMW is also the partner festival of an international Keychange initiative which encourages festivals and music organisations to achieve a 50:50 gender balance by 2022.

TMW's line-up is selected from artist applications by a team of Estonian and international curators and presented to an audience of around 20,000 and 1,000 industry professionals.

TMW's strategic partner is the music industry development centre and export office Music Estonia (ME). The membership of both TMW and ME in the European talent exchange network ETEP has enabled at least two Estonian artists to perform at the acclaimed Eurosonic Noorderslag festival every year. The Songwriting Camp, launched in collaboration between TMW, ME and Estonian national Eurovision Song Contest selection Eesti Laul has fostered the collaboration of Estonian and international artists and producers.  As part of the Finnish-Estonian export project Finest Sounds (2016 - 2019), several Estonian artists like Mari Kalkun, Peedu Kass and Talbot have been showcased in Japan, and Japanese music industry delegates have taken part in TMW seminars and workshops.

Among the Estonian acts who have performed at the festival and have won TMW's annual artist award (Skype Award 2009–2014, Wire Prize 2015, Telliskivi Creative City Award 2016, Telia & Telliskivi Award 2017–2018), are Popidiot (2009), Iiris (2010), Ewert and The Two Dragons (2011), Talbot (2012), Elephants From Neptune (2013), Odd Hugo (2014), Maarja Nuut (2015), I Wear* Experiment (2016), Mart Avi, Erki Pärnoja, NOËP (2017) and Mart Avi, Mari Kalkun, Holy Motors (2018).

Among the notable international acts who have performed at the festival are Vashti Bunyan (UK), C Duncan (UK), The Membranes (UK), Glen Matlock (UK), Eric Copeland (US), Kara-Lis Coverdale (CA), Motorama (RU), Shortparis (RU), Kate NV (RU), Kate Boy (SE), Rubik (FI), Kimmo Pohjonen (FI), Jaakko Eino Kalevi (FI), Liima (DK/FI), Kristjan Järvi (US), Yukon Blonde (CA), Sturle Dagsland (NO), Hauschka (DE), Alexander Hacke (DE).

Conference 
Besides music industry ABC, the TMW conference has looked into the impact of arts as an engine for the economy and the functioning of an innovative society while offering inspiration to around 1,000 music professionals, creatives, entrepreneurs and policy makers from different areas. Important keywords throughout the event have been civil activism and sustainable development. TMW's conference was the first international conference in Estonia to reach a gender balance among speakers in 2018.

Throughout the festival's existence several international industry experts, artistic figures and pop mavericks have participated in the conference panel discussions, among them Seymour Stein, the founder and president of Sire Records (Madonna, Ramones), influential managers Simon Napier-Bell (The Yardbirds, Marc Bolan, Wham!), Petri Lunden (Cardigans, Europe), Edward Bicknell (Dire Straits, Scott Walker, Bryan Ferry), Peter Jenner (Pink Floyd), artists-turned authors Viv Albertine (The Slits), John Robb (The Membranes, Louder Than War), Bob Stanley (St Etienne), renown acts like Glen Matlock (Sex Pistols, Rich Kids), polymath musician Barry Adamson, Russian feminist punk rock protest group Pussy Riot, influential musicologists like Simon Reynolds and Adam Harper and many others.

Since 2016 the TMW conference has expanded from music industry topics towards a wider social agenda and presented various visionaries from different subject fields, among them the US-based entrepreneur and philanthropist Hamdi Ulukaya, artist and activist iO Tillett Wright, gene researcher Lili Milani, MEP Felix Reda, Silicon Valley’s business angel Fadi Bishara, city developer Gunvor Kronman, pioneering post-punk designer Malcolm Garrett.

City Festival 
TMW’s city festival offers daytime programme from art, design and cuisine to kids’ workshops and invites to take part in public discussions and explorations of urban space.

Awards and credits 
 2011: the "Best Newish Event in 2011" award at The Great Escape music conference.
 2012: the "Best Hotel and Convention Bar" with the festival's hotel and convention center Nordic Hotel Forum.
 2014: the "Best Host City Champion" for promoting the city of Tallinn.
 2014: Tampere Music Award for Exceptional Achievements in Music to Helen Sildna, the founder and director of Tallinn Music Week.
2016: The Order of the White Star of IV Class to Tallinn Music Week founder Helen Sildna for her contribution to Estonian music life and civil society.

In autumn 2014, British daily The Guardian and Sunday paper The Observer picked the top 5 music festivals in the world for winter breaks, among them Tallinn Music Week.

Media coverage 
In 2014, British quality daily The Guardian picked the Top 10 music festivals for winter breaks and Tallinn Music Week was among them. “Tallinn is known for its art-nouveau architecture, free public transport – and its ability to attract stag and hen parties. It's also becoming increasingly relevant for the music it serves up, especially at this developing annual event." the paper said.

In 2014, Experty.by's Źmicier Biezkaravajny via Belorusy i rynok said, “The Tallinn one is attractive primarily because it is one of the highest-rated but at the same time affordable events in terms of opportunities for a little-known artist to demonstrate its work to a foreign listener.”

In 2016, Tom Hawking on Flavorwire pointed out that "/.../ the Estonian national government clearly has no problem providing state funding for such an endeavor, as well as getting involved in other, more hands-on ways. And by that, I mean that the freaking President of Estonia played a DJ set at this year's festival. As much as "cool" is an integral part of Barack Obama's brand, it's hard to imagine him getting on the wheels of steel to drop an impromptu Chicago house set."

In 2017–2018 The Quietus has published articles on Estonian experimental music and acknowledged TMW for “promoting leftfield adventurous artists and feeding off questions of gender identity and social righteousness”.

In 2019 Forbes introduced the TMW festival centre Telliskivi Creative City as the new burgeoning arts hub.

References

External links 

 

Music festivals in Estonia
Culture in Tallinn
Spring (season) events in Estonia